Nikolay Petrovich Ivanov (20 August 1949 – 8 June 2012) was a Leningrad-born Russian rower who competed for the Soviet Union in the 1972 Summer Olympics and in the 1976 Summer Olympics. In 1972 he was a crew member of the Soviet boat which finished fifth in the coxed pairs event. Four years later he won the gold with the Soviet boat in the coxed fours competition.

References

External links
 

1949 births
2012 deaths
Russian male rowers
Soviet male rowers
Rowers at the 1972 Summer Olympics
Rowers at the 1976 Summer Olympics
Olympic rowers of the Soviet Union
Medalists at the 1976 Summer Olympics
Olympic medalists in rowing
Olympic gold medalists for the Soviet Union
Place of death missing
Rowers from Saint Petersburg
World Rowing Championships medalists for the Soviet Union
European Rowing Championships medalists